Professor Watchlist is a website, run by conservative advocacy organization Turning Point USA, that lists academic staff which Turning Point believes "discriminate against conservative students, promote anti-American values and advance leftist propaganda in the classroom." It was launched in 2016 and as of December the same year, the website listed about 200 professors. The Professor Watchlist currently includes Al Sharpton, Angela Davis, Michael Eric Dyson, Ibram X. Kendi, Robin D.G. Kelley, Nikole Hannah-Jones, Joy Reid, Noam Chomsky, James Comey, John Brennan, Hunter Biden, and Peter Strzok.

Responses to the site include the American Association of University Professors and The New York Times raising fears that it threatens academic freedoms by harassing and intimidating staff, conservative magazine National Review describing it as an "irritable gesture" of victimhood by conservatives, and concerns about the safety and welfare of staff following a trend of threatening behaviour and communication, including rape and death threats, being sent to listed faculty.

In December 2016, 1500 professors and faculty from across the globe petitioned to have their name added to the list in solidarity with academics who had been targeted and intimidated following their listing, with the message that the listed are “the sort of company we wish to keep.” Turning Point UK also maintains a similar site, Education Watch, which has been described as "McCarthyism in the UK", despite gaining support from Conservative MP Jacob Rees-Mogg and Home Secretary Priti Patel. The Council for the Defence of British Education has also called Education Watch "populist rightwing propaganda".

Sourcing
Concerns have also been raised about the process in which academic staff are listed. Professors have reported being listed for any discussion of race or politics, including in academic publications. Julio Cesar Pino, a professor of Latin American history, was added to the list on the basis of rumours that the FBI may have investigated him for having connections to ISIS. Lamb, a director of constitutional enforcement and transparency at Turning Point, has described the site as "simply aggregating" professors who have been the subject of news reports.

Campus Reform, a part of the Leadership Institute, and Discover the Networks, a website run by the David Horowitz Freedom Center, was the source for most of the professors initially listed on the Professor Watchlist.

Concerns
Slate columnist Rebecca Schuman described the website as "abjectly terrifying" and said that she feared for the safety of the listed professors. Some have criticized the website as a threat to academic freedom; Hans-Joerg Tiede, the associate secretary for the American Association of University Professors' department of academic freedom, tenure and governance, told The New York Times: "There is a continuing cycle of these sorts of things. They serve the same purpose: to intimidate individuals from speaking plainly in their classrooms or in their publications." One professor included in the site, George Yancy, wrote that it is "essentially a new species of McCarthyism, especially in terms of its overtones of 'disloyalty' to the American republic".

According to Inside Higher Ed, some critics consider the website "more annoying than dangerous".

Critics including Peter Dreier of Occidental College—who is listed on the site for having criticized the National Rifle Association and using Howard Zinn's A People's History of the United States as a required text—have pointed out errors of fact that may make Professor Watchlist less than reliable as a source of information. Dreier's entry formerly listed him as a former employee of the Industrial Areas Foundation and as the man who inspired college student Barack Obama to become a community organizer. Dreier identifies these claims about him as "complete fantasy". He also noted elements of his biography that the website completely omitted, such as his work with labor unions, his activism in favor of a minimum wage, and the books he wrote.

Kent State professor Julio Pino said to The New York Times the site is "a kind of normalizing of prosecuting professors, shaming professors, defaming professors."

The website's organizers say that it simply provides conservative students with a guide to their professors, akin to RateMyProfessors.com, enabling them to avoid left-wing classes.

Over one hundred University of Notre Dame faculty members signed an open letter asking to be included in the site, saying in part:

In response to the Notre Dame letter, University of Chicago psychology professor Leslie Kay started the website "Free Academics". This website lists the names of professors across the United States who have signed it to ask for their names to be added to the list. As of December 2016, it had over 1,500 signatories.

The list has been accused of disproportionately targeting professors of color and other minority professors.

See also
 Canary Mission
 Charlie Kirk
 Turning Point USA

References

External links
 

Academic freedom
Academic scandals
American conservative websites
Anti-intellectualism
Internet properties established in 2016
Tertiary educational websites